Ab Ayega Mazaa is a 1984 Indian Hindi-language film directed by Pankaj Parashar and produced by actors Alok Nath and Girija Shankar. It stars Farooq Sheikh and Anita Raj . This film introduced music directors Anand–Milind who went on to make it big after the film Qayamat Se Qayamat Tak.

Cast 

 Farooq Sheikh ... Vijay
 Anita Raj ... Nupur
 Ravi Baswani ... Sidey/Siddharth
Raja Bundela ... Ramesh
Satish Kaushik ... Khajju
 Girja Shankar ... Chopra seth, Vijay's boss
S M Zaheer ... Om seth, Nupur's Father
Himani Shivpuri ... Mitthu – Chopra's lost Daughter (as Himani Bhatt)
Vinita Malik... Imarti
Pavan Malhotra ... Mukti
Rajesh Puri

Soundtrack 
Lyrics: Sameer

References

External links 
 
 Ab Ayega Mazaa on U-tube

1980 films
1980s Hindi-language films
Films scored by Anand–Milind
Films directed by Pankuj Parashar